The Flag of the Nordic Council is blue (PMS 300 U), with a stylised circular motif of a white swan. The swan symbol was chosen to represent the Nordic Council, and the Nordic Council of Ministers, in 1984. The Nordic swan symbolises trust, integrity and freedom. It is also designed to symbolise wider Nordic cooperation.

Before 2016, the flag was white, with a stylised circular motif of a white swan upon a blue (Pantone Reflex Blue C) disk. The Swan had enough wing feathers standing for the eight members and territories of the council: Denmark, Finland, Iceland, Norway, Sweden, Åland, the Faroe Islands and Greenland. The flag was designed by Kyösti Varis, an artist from Finland.

All members of the Council except for Greenland use a Nordic Cross Flag. The Nordic Cross was also used in the flag of the Kalmar Union. The Kalmar Union was the only time when all Nordic countries were under a single state–hence it has traditionally been a sign of unity before the Nordic Council adopted the swan flag.

See also
 Nordic swan

References

External links
 Logo section for Design Manual of the Nordic Council of Ministers and Nordic Council. 
 www.crwflags.com, Nordic Council, Flags of the World
 www.norden.org Nordic Council
 The history of the Swan symbol, the logo of the Nordic Co-operation

Flags of international organizations
Nordic Council
Flags introduced in 2016